Raquel Carrera Quintana (born 31 October 2001) is a Spanish professional basketball player for Valencia Basket of the Liga Femenina in Spain. She was drafted by the Atlanta Dream with the 15th overall in the 2021 WNBA Draft, but her draft rights were later traded to the New York Liberty. Carrera is the highest Spanish player ever picked in the WNBA draft.

Carrera spent three years in Spain's Women's League 2 with Celta Zorka, where she averaged 12.3 points and 6.5 rebounds. She signed with Valencia in 2019 on a five-year contract. After signing with Valencia, Carrera spent a year with Araski while recovering from injury before returning to Valencia. In her first season with Valencia Basket she won the 2020-21 EuroCup Women scoring two last-second free-throws.

EuroCup statistics

National team career
Carrera made her international debut at the 2016 FIBA Under-17 World Championship for Women when she was 14-years-old. She has competed in that tournament twice times, placing 6th in both. She also competed in European U16 tournaments, for which she won gold in 2016 and silver in 2017, and the European U18, for which she won silver in 2018. In 2021, Carrera was chosen to the Spanish Women's National Team, participating in the 2021 EuroBasket and the 2020 Summer Olympics. Up to end of the year, she had 19 caps, with 5.5 PPG:
 6th 2016 FIBA Under-17 World Championship (youth)
  2016 FIBA Europe Under-16 Championship (youth) 
 5th 2017 FIBA Europe Under-16 Championship (youth) 
 6th 2018 FIBA Under-17 World Championship (youth)
  2018 FIBA Europe Under-18 Championship (youth) 
 7th 2021 Eurobasket
 6th 2020 Summer Olympics

References

External links
 
 
 
 
 

2001 births
Living people
Atlanta Dream draft picks
Basketball players at the 2020 Summer Olympics
Olympic basketball players of Spain
Sportspeople from Ourense
Power forwards (basketball)
Spanish women's basketball players